Billy Hole  ( – ) was a Welsh international footballer. He was part of the Wales national football team between 1921 and 1928, playing 9 matches and scoring 1 goal. He played his first match on 9 April 1921, against Ireland and his last match on 17 November 1928 against England.

See also
 List of Wales international footballers (alphabetical)

References

1897 births
Welsh footballers
Wales international footballers
Place of birth missing
Date of death missing
Association footballers not categorized by position